The following is a list of international bilateral treaties between Australia and Bolivia

 Early treaties were extended to Australia by the British Empire, however they are still generally in force.
 As of 2017, only extradition treaties have been signed between the two countries.

References

Treaties of Australia
Treaties of Bolivia